Belmont Courthouse is in the Toquima Range of Nye County.

The partially restored courthouse, which is open to the public, was built in 1876. Most of the restoration was completed by Brett Perchetti. It was the seat of Nye County government until 1905.

The Courthouse was deeded to the Nevada State Parks in 1974 and transferred to Nye County in 2012.

References

External links 

Belmont Courthouse

History museums in Nevada
Museums in Nye County, Nevada
Buildings and structures in Nye County, Nevada
Protected areas established in 1974
Courthouses in Nevada